, formerly AKI Corporation and The Man Breeze, is an independent video game development studio located in Kichijōji, Tokyo, Japan, founded on June 19, 1995. The company is best known for its popular wrestling games in the late 1990s and early-mid-2000s, starting with the release of Virtual Pro-Wrestling in 1996. The title was the first entry in the Virtual Pro Wrestling series.

The company's take on World Championship Wrestling proved successful in the late 1990s with the release of several games, culminating in WCW/nWo Revenge for the Nintendo 64. As a result, the World Wrestling Federation ended their twelve-year relationship with Acclaim Entertainment and partnered with THQ/AKI in 1999. The relationship would continue AKI's reputation for quality wrestling games, which ended with the release of WWF No Mercy.

History

The company went public in 1998 and on April 1, 2007 was renamed syn Sophia, Inc. The first game developed under that name was Ganbaru Watashi no Kakei Diary for the Nintendo DS in 2007. However, they used their previous name in some of their future titles until 2008 with the release of Style Savvy for the Nintendo DS. Ready 2 Rumble: Revolution would be developed under the name AKI Corporation USA.

Games

Developed under The Man Breeze

Developed under AKI Corporation

Developed under syn Sophia, Inc.

Unreleased games
A version of WWF No Mercy for the Game Boy Color was in the works and planned for release alongside the Nintendo 64 version. The game was originally planned to utilize the Nintendo 64 Transfer Pak accessory to unlock special content in each version of the game. This feature was later scrapped, however, with the extra content in each version instead being unlocked via gameplay. After further developmental woes, the game was shifted to Natsume, developers of the previous WWF game for Game Boy Color, before finally being canceled in late December 2000. Screenshots of this game at one point existed, but the websites which had them up were forced to remove them following the game's cancellation.

A sequel to WWF No Mercy was in the early stages of development when it was shelved in early 2001 as Nintendo began to phase out the Nintendo 64 console. However, Sanders Keel, producer of various AKI wrestling titles, mentioned in a podcast with Pro Wrestling X producer Dave Wishnowski that the AKI-THQ relationship had deteriorated when AKI requested to no longer develop for the Nintendo systems following the release of the Nintendo 64, proving the No Mercy sequel as a rumor.

A sequel to Electronic Arts' WCW Mayhem titled WCW 2000 and later, WCW Mayhem 2 was going to be developed by AKI and was planned for a PlayStation 2 release. There were even some screenshots featured in Issue #33 (May 2000) of the Official PlayStation Magazine. However, it was also shelved in 2001 after the World Wrestling Federation purchased World Championship Wrestling. The engine of this game would later be recycled for Def Jam Vendetta.

A puzzle video game spinoff of the Dreamcast game Animastar, titled Animastar Puzzle, was announced in early 2000 but was later cancelled, presumably due to the sudden demise of the Dreamcast console.

Mikke! was an action game announced for the Nintendo DS console in early 2008. It was later cancelled for unknown reasons.

In 2019, Game Informer journalist Imran Khan reported on numerous games that were cancelled mid-development for the Nintendo 3DS due to the commercial failure of Mario & Luigi: Bowser's Inside Story + Bowser Jr.'s Journey. Among those named was an entry into the Style Savvy series.

References

External links
  
 (Website Currently Unavailable.) (AKI Corporation USA) 

Amusement companies of Japan
Software companies based in Tokyo
Video game companies established in 1995
Japanese companies established in 1995
Video game companies of Japan
Video game development companies